Luis José Silva Michelena, best known as Ludovico Silva (1937–1988) was a Venezuelan poet and philosopher. A Marxist philosopher, he developed an account of ideology as symbolic surplus.

Life
Luis José Silva Michelena was born in Caracas on February 16, 1937, the son of Hector Silva Urbano and Josefina Michelena. He was educated at a private school, the Colegio San Ignacio, Caracas, before travelling to study philosophy, literature and philology in Spain, France and Germany. From 1970 to 1986 he was a professor of philosophy at the Central University of Venezuela. From 1964 to 1968 he was head of the Caracas Athenaeum. With Miguel Otero Silva he founded the literary magazine Lamigal.

Heavy drinking caused his brain to be affected by excess ammonium, and in 1986 he was committed to a mental institution for 33 days. He died in Caracas on December 8, 1988.

Works
 Tenebra, 1964
 La Plusvalía Ideológica [Ideological surplus], 1970
 El estilo literario de Marx [Marx's literary style], 1970
 Teoría y práctica de la ideología [Theory and practice of ideology], 1971
 Anti-manual para uso de marxistas, marxólogos y marxianos [Anti-manual for the use of Marxists, Marxologists and Marxians], 1975
 El estilo literario de Marx [Marx's literary style], 1975
 Marx’s Literary Style, Verso 2023, ISBN 9781839765537.
 Ensayos temporales: Poesía y teoría social [Temporary essays: poetry and social theory], 1983
 La alienación como sistema: la teoría de la alienación en la obra de Marx [Alienation as a system: the theory of alienation in Marx's work], 1983
 La interpretación femenina de la historia y otros ensayos [The female interpretation of history and other essays], 1987
 Opera poética, 1958-1982 [Poetical works, 1958-1982], 1988
 La torre de los ángeles [The tower of the angels], 1991

References

1937 births
1988 deaths
Venezuelan poets
Venezuelan philosophers
20th-century philosophers